For New Generations (abbr. ZNG) is a social liberal and green liberal political party in Bosnia and Herzegovina. It was founded on 29 April 2022.

History
For New Generations was founded by Federal House of Peoples member Damir Marjanović on 29 April 2022. 

At the 2022 general election, the party contested all levels of government except for the Presidency. Running in a coalition with the People's European Union, both parties gained one seat in the national House of Representatives.

Elections

Parliamentary elections

Cantonal elections

References

External links
Official Website

Liberal parties in Bosnia and Herzegovina
Green liberalism
Pro-European political parties in Bosnia and Herzegovina
Secularism in Bosnia and Herzegovina
Political parties established in 2022
2022 establishments in Bosnia and Herzegovina